The Centre on Housing Rights and Evictions (COHRE) was a Geneva-based international non-governmental organisation founded in 1994 by Scott Leckie as a foundation in the Netherlands (Stichting COHRE).

Offices
At its height in 2008, COHRE maintained offices in Switzerland, Ghana, South Africa, Sri Lanka, Cambodia, Brazil and the United States and carried out work through three Regional Programmes covering Africa, Asia and the Americas as well as five Thematice Programmes covering economic, social and cultural rights strategic litigation; women and housing rights; forced evictions; housing and land restitution; and the rights to water and sanitation.  As of the end of 2011, COHRE maintained registered offices in the Asia-Pacific region (Cambodia) and Africa (Kenya). These remaining offices coordinated regional and local activities in pursuit of COHRE’s mission. COHRE’s mission is to ensure the full enjoyment of the human right to adequate housing for everyone, everywhere, including preventing forced evictions of persons, families and communities from their homes or lands.  COHRE ceased operations in early 2012.

COHRE had been granted Special Consultative Status by the United Nations Economic and Social Council (ECOSOC, 1999), and the Organisation of American States (OAS, 2002), and had participatory status with the Council of Europe (CoE, 2003) as well as Observer Status with the African Commission on Human and Peoples' Rights (ACHRP, 2003).

Programmes
Through three regional programmes covering Africa, Asia-Pacific and the Americas, COHRE had joined forces with partners non-governmental organisations (NGOs), communities and committed professionals, in pursuit of the goal of housing rights for everyone, everywhere.

During more than a decade of promoting housing rights throughout the world, COHRE learnt that there is no single methodology that can address the wide range of processes undermining the right to adequate housing. This is because the problem of housing rights is simply too pervasive, the causes too diverse, for blueprint responses or methodologies to be effective. For example, a particular housing rights violation, such as a mass forced eviction, could be the result of a locally administered development project that has been initiated by the national government, in the context of an externally enforced financial restructuring programme, and funded by international donor organisations. It could be caused by a combination of rapid urbanisation, pervasive tenure insecurity, and political conflict. It might be the consequence of inadequate legal protection for the poor. Again, it might be the result of preparations to host a mega-event such as a world cup tournament or the Olympic Games.

Tools
COHRE developed and tested a range of tools, to be used in different combinations and at different levels, as each particular situation demands. These include:

Partnerships and joint strategies
COHRE’s work was based on the assumption that the role of the affected communities is of crucial importance in addressing housing rights violations. The poor themselves should be directly involved in formulating and implementing solutions and alternatives. Communities have a vital contribution to make, without which most housing-related projects simply will not succeed. In housing rights or eviction cases where COHRE became directly involved, COHRE therefore strived to build alliances and partnerships and to embark on joint campaigns with groups and support organisations working at community level.

Working at community level is often not sufficient in itself. As national, regional and international action can be very effective in cases of major housing rights violations, COHRE also formed partnerships with organisations working at these broader levels.

Fact-finding investigations
Another tool is the collection of relevant, accurate information. COHRE regularly sends multi-disciplinary fact-finding teams to key focus countries. They typically conduct in-loco investigations, conduct interviews with the main role players, study relevant laws, policies and programmes and do any additional research required for an assessment of the nature and scope of land and housing rights violations in a particular situation. This would provide the basis for drawing up recommendations and alternatives. These missions are usually conducted at the request of, and in collaboration with, local partners.

COHRE used the draft fact-finding reports as tools for consultation and negotiations with key role-players, including governments. This strategy has proven effective in convincing government to grapple with the extent of the violations and the implications of proceeding with current policies and practice. Once finalised, COHRE fact-finding reports are used as information resources for local human rights organisations and the affected communities; for lobbying the relevant government to introduce new policies, laws and programmes. Fact-finding reports are also useful tools at regional and international level to place pressure on the relevant governments; and to form the basis of shadow reports for submission before UN human rights mechanisms and other regional and international bodies.

Advocacy
COHRE supported local groups and support organisations to mobilise and campaign against housing rights violations by issuing formal letters of protest to governments, presenting submissions to government missions, launching joint action campaigns, and exerting public pressure through media exposure. In cases of extreme and sustained violations, without any attempt by the governments concerned to take remedial steps, COHRE would consider including the country concerned in the list of housing rights violators as part of its Housing Rights Violator, Protector and Defender Awards, announced at the end of every year until 2008. This tool had proven remarkably effective in naming and shaming perpetrators of the worst housing rights violations, while at the same time highlighting positive efforts by governments and individuals to promote and protect the housing rights of communities.

Litigation
In the past, COHRE undertook strategic litigation to enforce human rights standards, remedy past human rights violations and generate beneficial jurisprudence in the area of economic, social and cultural rights. COHRE's work in this area included legal advice for test cases at the domestic level, taking cases before international and regional judicial forums in the event that domestic courts fail to provide an adequate remedy, and capacity-building training and workshops for judges, lawyers and other human rights advocates. In 2009, COHRE lead two cases before the European Committee of Social Rights: No. 52/2008 against Croatia and No. 58/2009 against Italy.

The strategic litigation work that COHRE once undertook was continued by the Global Initiative for Economic, Social and Cultural Rights.

Regional and International Bodies
Action at regional and international levels is an important tool to support national struggles addressing housing rights violations. In many instances, decisions issued at the United Nations level or by regional human rights mechanisms play an important role in changing a government policy or legislation, while also providing crucial support to groups and communities fighting forced evictions and other housing rights violations. With its International Secretariat in Geneva, COHRE regularly provides direct access to the United Nations for groups in the developing world to conduct specific advocacy and lobbying, get concrete decisions and recommendations helping them in their struggle, learn about the UN human rights machinery and get crucial contacts and supports for their case. COHRE also arranges petitions and presentations to regional bodies such as the Inter-American Commission on Human Rights and the African Commission on Human and Peoples’ Rights.

Training
COHRE engaged in extensive training programmes with grassroots groups, NGOs, government officials, lawyers and judges. Training programmes are tailored to meet the needs of a particular target group and context. Community groups and support organisations were assisted to understand their rights and to develop strategies to realise those rights, participation in housing rights movements and the formulation of alternatives. Lawyers were trained to be more sensitive to the needs and the role of communities, and to incorporate international legal protections into their arguments. Government officials were introduced to the concept of housing as a human right, the importance of allowing affected communities to participate directly in their programmes, and lessons from international best practice. Judges were introduced to the provisions and importance of international law. The different groups were also brought together to exchange ideas and to develop joint strategies.

Promoting policy and legislative reform
COHRE promotes policy and legislative reform at national, regional and international level, to ensure that housing rights and delivery frameworks and legal instruments are improved where it is possible.

Publications 
 2009 N2 Gateway Project: Housing Rights Violations as ‘Development’ in South Africa" by the Centre on Housing Rights and Evictions (COHRE)
 K. Hassine, Regularizing Property Rights in Kosovo & Elsewhere,COHRE’s Impact as Non-State Actor for the International Protection of Housing, Land and Property Rights, WikU Publisher, 2010
 K. Hassine, COHRE's Blueprint for Kosovo, September 2009.
 COHRE publications archive

References

External links
COHRE web-site

Housing rights organizations
International human rights organizations
Organizations with participatory status with the Council of Europe